There were elections in 1909 to the United States House of Representatives:

|-
| 
| Robert C. Davey
|  | Democratic
| 18921894 1896
|  | Incumbent member-elect died during previous congress.New member elected March 30, 1909.Democratic hold.
| nowrap | 

|-
| 
| Theodore E. Burton
|  | Republican
| 
|  | Incumbent member-elect resigned during previous congress.New member elected April 20, 1909. Republican hold.
| nowrap | 

|-
| 
| William Lorimer
|  | Republican
| 
|  | Incumbent resigned June 17, 1909, after being elected to the U.S. Senate.New member elected November 23, 1909.Republican hold.
| nowrap | 

|-
| 
| Francis W. Cushman
|  | Republican
| 1898
|  | Incumbent died July 6, 1909.New member elected November 2, 1909.Republican hold.
| nowrap | 

|-
| 
| Pablo Ocampo
|  | Democratic
|  1907
|  | Term ended November 22, 1909.New delegate elected November 23, 1909.Unionist gain.
| nowrap | 

|}

References

 
1909